Hortus Botanicus is a botanical garden in the Plantage district of Amsterdam, the Netherlands. It is one of the world's oldest botanical gardens.

History

The Amsterdam city council founded the Hortus Botanicus (initially named the Hortus Medicus) in 1638 to serve as a herb garden for doctors and apothecaries, as botanical extracts were the primary treatments for illnesses during this time period. Physicians and pharmacists received their training and took exams here.   

The garden's initial collection was amassed during the 17th century through plants and seeds brought back by traders from the Dutch East India Company for use as medicines and potential commercial possibilities. A single coffee plant in Hortus's collection served as the parent for the entire coffee culture in Central and South America.

Likewise, two small potted oil palms brought back from Mauritius produced seeds which were propagated throughout all of Southeast Asia, becoming a major source of revenue in the Dutch East Indies and present-day Indonesia.

In 1646, Johannes Snippendaal was appointed director of the garden. During his tenure, he determined the collection comprised 796 plant species, most of which were medicinal plants. Many of these plants are still grown at the Hortus Botanicus in its Snippendaal garden, referred to as 'the 17th century pharmacopoeia of Amsterdam’.

The hexagonal pavilion dates from the late 1600s. The entrance gate was built in the early 1700s. The Orangery dates from 1875, and the Palm House and Hugo de Vries Laboratory - both created in Amsterdam School expressionist architecture - date from 1912 and 1915.

Hugo de Vries became the director of the Hortus Botanicus between 1885 and 1918, bringing international attention to the garden.  The garden's governing board directed the construction of the Palm House and laboratory in order to keep the professor there. 

in 1987 the garden almost went bankrupt when the University of Amsterdam stopped paying its expenses, but a community of individual supporters prevented its closure. The Hortus Botanicus is now supported by the Amsterdam City Council.

Attractions
Hortus Botanicus is a popular attraction for both Dutch and international visitors. The collection is famous for its trees and plants, some of which are endangered. Well-known plants and trees can be found here, like the Persian ironwood tree.

Recent additions to Hortus include a large hothouse, which incorporates three different tropical climates. There are also two halls in the garden, which are used for conferences and ceremonies, and a café.

Gallery

References

External links

 

1638 establishments in the Dutch Republic
Botanical gardens in the Netherlands
Buildings and structures in Amsterdam
Parks in Amsterdam